In Greek mythology, the Elasioi (Ancient Greek: Ἐλάσιοι, meaning 'Averters' or 'Expellers'; in Latin, 'Elasii') were minor personages with power to avert epileptic attacks. In the case of someone suffering an epileptic episode in progress, they were sometimes said to cure the ailment by banishing it into the bodies of wild goats.

Yet, their role in society beyond the former remains unclear. Most seem to regard them as divinities of healing; some conflate them with an Argive incarnation of The Dioskouroi (which implies that there are only two, and that both are male), though other sources claim they are female (without regard for their number), and some seem to imply that they were simply mortal magicians or wizards (and takes no regard of either specific number or gender).

Either way, the Elasioi were said to be children or descendants of the heroine Alexida, daughter of the deified Amphiaraus.

References

Mythology of Argos
Greek gods
Demigods in classical mythology
Fictional twins
Epilepsy